White trout is a common name for several fish and may refer to:

Cynoscion arenarius
Salmo trutta